Cleland Hospital is a health facility in Auchinlea Drive, Cleland, North Lanarkshire, Scotland. It is managed by NHS Lanarkshire.

History
The facility has its origins in the Omoa Poorhouse, which was designed by Alexander Cullen and opened in 1903. Following closure of the poorhouse in 1939, the buildings were converted for use as a military hospital during the Second World War. The new facility then joined the National Health Service as Cleland Hospital in 1948.

After services had been transferred to a modern community hospital on the east side of the site, the old hospital buildings were demolished in 2008.

Notes

References

1903 establishments in Scotland
Hospitals established in 1903
Hospital buildings completed in 2005
NHS Scotland hospitals
Hospitals in North Lanarkshire
NHS Lanarkshire